See also Ghazi and Gazi (disambiguation)

Abdullah Shah Ghazi (c. 720 - c. 768) was a Muslim mystic and Sufi whose shrine is located in Clifton in Karachi, in Sindh province of Pakistan. His real name was Abdullah al-Ashtar. His father, Muhammad al-Nafs al-Zakiyya, was a descendant of the Holy Prophet Muhammad Sallallahu ‘alaihi Wa Salam through his daughter Fatimah RadiAllahu ‘anha.

Life in Sindh
Around 761, Muhammad Nafs al-Zakiyah sailed from Aden to Sind where he consulted with the governor, Umar ibn Hafs  Hazarmard before returning to Kufah and Medina. His son, Abdullah al-Ashtar, also known as Abdullah Shah Ghazi, married a woman from Sindh and had children by her. According to Tabari, Sindh was selected since its governor, Umar ibn Hafs, supported Muhammad's claim to the Imamate. Ibn Khaldun and Ibn al-Athir say that the governor had Shi'ite inclinations. 

Once they decided enough support had been amassed to revolt successfully (762), Muhammad went to Medina, and Abdullah al-Ashtar stayed in Sind. Abdullah al-Ashtar was accompanied by a number of troops belonging to the Shi'ite sect of Zaydiyah, who at the time were  active supporters of Ahlulbayt, willing to take a militant stance in pursuit of the Imamate. Shortly thereafter, however, Umar received word from his wife in Basrah that Muhammad Nafs Al-Zakiyah had been killed in Medina (14 Ramadan 145/6 December 762). As a consequence, Umar felt that their presence in the capital compromised his position as governor. Unwilling to take any definite action either for or against them, he summoned Abdullah al-Ashtar and suggested:

"I have an idea: one of the princes of Sindh has a mighty kingdom with numerous supporters. Despite his polytheism, he greatly honours [the family of] the Prophet. He is a reliable man. I will write to him and conclude an agreement between the two of you. You can then go to him, stay there, and you will not desire anything better."

Abdullah al-Ashtar went to that area and spent some years there, probably from 762 to 769. Eventually hearing of their presence in Sindh, the caliph al-Mansur replaced Umar ibn Hafs with Hisham ibn Amr al-Taghlibi on the understanding that he seize Abdullah al-Ashtar, kill or otherwise disperse the Zaydiyah, and annex the non-Muslim region. When Hisham, after reaching Sind, also proved loath to undertake the task, his brother Sufayh (later a governor of Sindh) did it for him, killing Abdullah along with many of his companions.

Martyrdom

Sohail Lari suggested in his book, A History of Sindh that Shah Ghazi was an Arab merchant who had come to Sindh with the first wave of Arab conquerors. However, another historian, M. Daudpota, suggested that Ghazi arrived in the area from Iraq as a commander, who along with Muhammad ibn al-Qasim, fought Sindh's Hindu ruler, Raja Dahir, in the eighth century. Abdullah Shah Ghazi was said to have been killed in a forest in the Sindh by his enemies. His devotees buried his body on top of a hill in a coastal area, where he had earlier arrived on an Arab ship. This area now lies in the vicinity of Clifton and Sea View in Karachi.

Shrine 
The tomb is built on a high platform, though the body is kept in a subterranean crypt. The shrine is made of a high, square chamber and a green-and-white striped dome, decorated with Sindhi tile work, flags and buntings. Devotees to the shrine caress the silver railing around the burial place and drape it with garlands of flowers. The shrine is highly regarded and respected by people of all ethnicities and religions.

Until the early twentieth century, the shrine was a small hut on top of a sandy hill in Clifton. The shrine was built and expanded by Syed Nadir Ali Shah, a Sufi saint of Lal Shahbaz Qalandar's Qalandariyya Sufi Order and the then custodian of the shrine. The iconic dome of the shrine, the windowed ambulatory, the Mosque, the free kitchens or Langar Khana, the Qawwali court and the pilgrim lodge in its premises as well as the long stairway leading to the shrine, were built under his supervision. The shrine has been a centre of attraction for people belonging to different sects, ethnicities and sections of society. Free meals and the devotional poetry such as Qawwali are notable features of the shrine. The shrine has always been devotionally connected to Syed Nadir Ali Shah's dervish lodge, called Kafi in Sehwan Sharif and for a long time the arrangements of the shrine and langar continued under his supervision. In 1962, the Auqāf department took over its administrative control.  In 2011, the shrine was handed over to a Pakistani construction giant, Bahria Town, who renovated the exterior of the shrine. This received a mixed response from the residents of Karachi.

The Abdullah Shah Ghazi shrine was attacked in 2010 by militants who detonated two suicide bombs at the shrine, killing 10 and injuring 50.

Langar 
The langar or free kitchen provides free nutritious meals, thrice a day, seven days a week to hundreds of needy people. It was initiated by the then custodian of the shrine, Syed Nadir Ali Shah in the 1930s, and has continued ever since.

See also
 List of mausoleums and shrines in Pakistan
 Muhammad al-Nafs al-Zakiyya, descendant of Imam Hasan ibn Ali
 Gazi Pir

References

Sufis of Sindh
720 births
History of Sindh
People from Medina
8th-century Arabs
Hasanids
Sufi saints
Sufi shrines in Pakistan
Shrines in Pakistan
768 deaths